Wilson Daniel Quiñonez (born 4 September 1988), known as Wilson Quiñonez, is  a Paraguayan professional footballer who plays as a goalkeeper for Sportivo San Lorenzo in the Paraguayan Primera División as of the 2020 season.

Career

Club career
Quiñonez was born in Fernando de la Mora, Paraguay and started his professional career with Sport Colombia in 2008. He is best known for scoring from 83 meters out with a free kick in a 2011 Paraguayan División Intermedia (second division) game between Sport Colombia and Cerro Porteño, considered one of the longest free kicks ever scored in FIFA history.

References

1988 births
Paraguayan footballers
Living people
Sport Colombia footballers
Sportivo Luqueño players
Sportivo Carapeguá footballers
Club Rubio Ñu footballers
12 de Octubre Football Club players
Club Tacuary footballers
Club Sportivo San Lorenzo footballers
Paraguayan Primera División players
People from Fernando de la Mora, Paraguay
Association football goalkeepers